Poylu (also, Poyli) is a village in the Agstafa Rayon of Azerbaijan.  The village forms part of the municipality of Poylu.

References 

Populated places in Aghstafa District